Archias may refer to:

Poets
Aulus Licinius Archias, Roman-era Greek poet from Antioch
Archias of Macedon, Archias of Byzantium, Archias of Mytilene, Archias the younger in Greek anthology

Statesmen
Archias of Corinth, founder of Syracuse in 734 or 733 BC
Archias of Thebes, Theban polemarch and tyrant in 379 BC
Archias of Pella, Macedonian trierarch, geographer
Archias of Thurii, Thuriian actor, officer of Antipater
Archias of Cyprus, governor of Cyprus in 2nd century BCE

Grammarians
Archias of Alexandria, Roman-era grammarian, teacher of Marcus Mettius Epaphroditus

Others
 Archias, a Spartan whom Herodotus mentions as falling in the Spartan attack on Samos in 525 BC.
 Archias, grandson of the above, whom Herodotus mentions personally meeting in Pitane.
 Archias of Corinth, a shipbuilder, architect of the Syracusia around 240 BC.